Room to Let is a 1950 British historical thriller film directed by Godfrey Grayson and starring Jimmy Hanley, Valentine Dyall and Constance Smith. It was adapted from the BBC radio play by Margery Allingham, broadcast in 1947.

Synopsis
After a fire at an insane asylum during the Edwardian era, a young journalist becomes convinced that one of the patients has escaped and taken lodgings at a local middle-class household. The mysterious "Doctor Fell" comes to dominate the three woman in the house - mother, daughter and maid - and increasingly shuts them off from outside contact. Despite a lack of assistance from the authorities, the journalist suspects that the Doctor is in fact the notorious Jack the Ripper who is planning a fresh series of attacks.

Cast
 Jimmy Hanley as Curly Minter  
 Valentine Dyall as Doctor Fell 
Christine Silver as Mrs. Musgrave
 Merle Tottenham as Alice  
 Constance Smith as Molly Musgrave  
 Charles Hawtrey as Mike Atkinson  
 Aubrey Dexter as Harding  
 Anthony La Penna as JJ  
 Reginald Dyson as Sergeant Cranbourne  
 Laurence Naismith as Editor  
 John Clifford as Atkinson  
 Stuart Saunders as Porter  
 Cyril Conway as Doctor Mansfield  
 Charles Houston as Tom  
 Harriet Petworth as Matron  
 Charles Mander  as P.C. Smith  
 H. Hamilton Earle as Orderly 
 F.A. Williams as Butler 
 Archie Callum as Night Watchman

Critical reception
TV Guide gave the film two out of five stars, calling it "A fairly disturbing programmer which remains suspenseful to the end." and Fantastic Movie Musings and Ramblings wrote, "This is basically a variation of THE LODGER, and a very effective one. Valentine Dyall steals the movie as the truly creepy lodger, Dr. Fell."

References

Bibliography
 Chibnall, Steve & McFarlane, Brian. The British 'B' Film. Palgrave MacMillan, 2009.

External links

1950 films
British historical thriller films
1950s historical thriller films
Films directed by Godfrey Grayson
Films set in London
Films set in the 1900s
Films about Jack the Ripper
Hammer Film Productions films
British black-and-white films
1950s English-language films
1950s British films